Guardian Angel is the sixteenth rock album by British instrumental (and sometimes vocal) group The Shadows, released in November 1984 through Polydor Records.

Release
Guardian Angel was the group's first album to be released on LP and CD simultaneously and only the group's second CD release. It had the distinction of being the group's only 1980s album to contain mostly original material, except for one track. The album and its single, "On A Night Like This" were not promoted strongly by Polydor and the album failed in commercial terms, spending one week at number 98 in the UK album chart. Only two tracks from this album became part of The Shadows' live repertoire, during the January to March 1985 "down-under" tour in Australia and New Zealand; the two tracks being "How Do I Love Thee" and "Hammerhead".

The album was reissued on CD in December 1998 on the now defunct See for Miles Records label and added eight tracks, two of which had never been issued on CD before.

Track listing

Personnel
Hank Marvin - Lead Guitar & Vocals
Bruce Welch - Rhythm Guitar & Vocals
Brian Bennett - Drums & Percussion
Cliff Hall - Keyboards
Alan Jones - Bass Guitar
Tony Rivers - Vocal Help

References 

1984 albums
Polydor Records albums
The Shadows albums